Eladio Herrera (February 9, 1930 - November 25, 2014) was an Argentine boxer. He competed at the 1948 Summer Olympics and the 1952 Summer Olympics.

Amateur career
Herrera won a bronze medal in the 1952 Summer Olympics, in Helsinki.

Professional career
Herrera fought once in 1953 and once in 1955, retiring with a career record of 1-1.

References

External links

Olympic Profile

1930 births
2014 deaths
Argentine male boxers
Olympic boxers of Argentina
Light-middleweight boxers
Boxers at the 1948 Summer Olympics
Boxers at the 1952 Summer Olympics
Olympic bronze medalists for Argentina
Olympic medalists in boxing
Medalists at the 1952 Summer Olympics